Yahya ibn Tamim was the Zirid ruler of Ifriqiya from 1108 to 1116 CE.

Life
Yahya inherited the throne from his father, Tamim ibn al-Mu'izz, in 1108. Tamim's long reign had left the Zirids weakened, as the Hilalian invasions had reduced their authority to the Tunisian coast, from Sousse to Gabes. Furthermore, Ifriqiya now faced a powerful Christian enemy in the form of the Italo-Norman Kingdom of Sicily to the north. 

In response, Yahya built a strong fleet, with which he raided the Republic of Genoa and Sardinia. He was succeeded by his son, Ali ibn Yahya.

References

Sources
 

1116 deaths
Zirid emirs of Ifriqiya
12th-century Berber people
12th-century rulers in Africa
12th-century people of Ifriqiya